The Fighters  is a 1939 Soviet drama film directed by Eduard Pentslin.

Plot 
Sergey, Nikolay and Varya went to school together. The guys have long competed with each other. After school, they entered different flight schools, but after graduation they ended up in the same military unit. Their commander, Major Tuchkov, deliberately gives them joint tasks, including testing a new device. During one of the flights, Sergei warns the train about an obstacle on the way, thereby preventing a crash.

Starring 
 Mark Bernes as Lieutenant Sergey Kozhukharov
 Vasiliy Dashenko as Lieutenant Nikolay Melnikov
 Yevgeniya Golynchik	as Varya
 Alexey Zagorsky as Professor		
 Boris Andreyev	as 	Lieutenant Ptenchik
 Varvara Zhuravlyova as Tanya 
 Pyotr Aleinikov	as 	Lieutenant
 Vladimir Uralsky as Kozhuharov's  father
 Fedor Seleznyov	 as Aviation technician Yashin
 Vyacheslav Gomolyaka as Commander

References

External links 
 

1939 films
1930s Russian-language films
Soviet drama films
1939 drama films
Soviet black-and-white films
Films about aviators